The Peugeot 401 was a mid-size model from Peugeot produced in 1934 and 1935. It was introduced at the October 1934 Paris Motor Show and was again on display at the 29th Paris Show of 1935.

It featured in a full page newspaper advertisement placed by Peugeot in "L'Argus" on 10 October 1935, and disappeared from the manufacturer's price list only three months later, at the start of 1936, reflecting the need to dispose of an inventory backlog. Production of the 401 had already come to an end in August 1935, less than a year after the model's introduction.

The Peugeot 401 was the first car to be built (by coachbuilder Carrosserie Pourtout) as a coupé-convertible, with a retractable hardtop, that could be moved and stowed under a reverse-hinged rear luggage lid.

Details

The 401 was powered by an enlarged version of the engine from the smaller Peugeot 301 and slotted between that model and the range-topping 601. The 401's four cylinder side-valve engine displaced 1,720 cc and produced  at 3,500 rpm.

Models of the 401 include the 401 D, 401 DL, and 401 DLT. Though the majority were made as sedans, the 401 was offered with no fewer than eleven different body styles.

Eclipse

Peugeot built an electric folding metal roof more than twenty years before Ford reimagined the concept in their (Galaxie) Skyliner Retractable. Peugeot seemed unsure what to call the car – their catalog spoke of both "coupé transformable electrique" and "cabriolet metallique decouvrable" – the system was simply called "Eclipse" by its original inventor and designer Georges Paulin. It was first introduced by Paulin, in collaboration with premier French coachbuilder Carrosserie Pourtout, on the 401D. 

The Eclipse was built on a standard Peugeot model 401D's chassis. It ranks as both the longest and lowest of the 401 models:
The 401D  straight four engine was rated at 12 taxable horsepower, roughly the equivalent of 50 to 60 horsepower, enough to propel the Eclipse to about 100 km/h (62 mph). A total of 79 Peugeot 401 Eclipses were made. Pourtout and Paulin also built Eclipse coaches of the 301 and 601, on chassis provided by Paris Peugeot-dealer Darl'mat.

Replacement
The all-steel bodied Peugeot 402, featuring a style regarded at the time as strikingly futuristic, was announced in October 1935, which coincided with significant price reductions for several of the previous generation of Peugeots, including the 401.

References

401
1930s cars
Cars introduced in 1934